Frank Gardner may refer to:

Frank Gardner (journalist) (born 1961), British journalist
Frank Gardner (racing driver) (1930–2009), Australian racing driver
Frank Gardner (politician) (1872–1937), U.S. Representative from Indiana
Frank Gardner (footballer), English footballer
Frank "Sprig" Gardner, wrestling coach

See also
Francis Gardner (1771–1835), U.S. Representative from New Hampshire
Frank Gardner Moore (1865–1955), American Latin scholar
Frank Gardiner (1830–1904), Australian bushranger